Phillipole Marak is an Indian politician and member of the National People's Party. Marak was a member of the Meghalaya Legislative Assembly from the Kherapara constituency in West Garo Hills district.

References 

People from West Garo Hills district
National People's Party (India) politicians
Nationalist Congress Party politicians from Meghalaya
Indian National Congress politicians
Meghalaya MLAs 2008–2013
Living people
Meghalaya politicians
21st-century Indian politicians
Year of birth missing (living people)
Garo people